The 1985 Louisiana Tech Bulldogs football team was an American football team that represented Louisiana Tech University as a member of the Southland Conference during the 1985 NCAA Division I-AA football season. In their third year under head coach A. L. Williams, the team compiled an 8–3 record.

Schedule

References

Louisiana Tech
Louisiana Tech Bulldogs football seasons
Louisiana Tech Bulldogs football